The Baltic Defense (also known as the Grau Defense, or the Sahovic Defense) is a chess opening characterized by the  moves:
1. d4 d5
2. c4 Bf5!?

The Baltic is an unusual variation of the Queen's Gambit Declined (QGD). In most defenses to the QGD,  Black has difficulties developing his . This opening takes a radical approach to the problem by bringing out the queen bishop immediately.

The Baltic has not found widespread acceptance among chess masters, but some world-class players have used it including grandmasters Paul Keres and Alexei Shirov.

The ECO code for the Baltic Defense is D06.

White responses
White has several replies to this opening, including 3.Nf3, 3.cxd5, 3.Qb3, and 3.Nc3. Play might continue:

3.Nf3 e6
 4.Qb3 Nc6
 4.e3 Nf6 5.Qb3 Nc6
 4.Nc3 Nf6 5.Qb3 Nc6
 4.cxd5 exd5 5.Qb3 Nc6

3.cxd5
3...Bxb1 4.Qa4+ Qd7 5.Qxd7+ Nxd7 6.Rxb1 Ngf6 7.Nf3

3.Qb3
3...e5 4.Qxb7 Nd7 5.Nf3 Rb8 6.Qxd5 Bb4+ 7.Nfd2 (7.Bd2 Ne7 Webb–Sinclair, England 1971) Ne7 8.Qf3 exd4 and Black has development and initiative for his pawn.

3.Nc3
3...e6 4.Qb3 (4.Nf3) Nc6 5.cxd5 exd5 6.Qxd5? (a mistake, as Black has 6...Nxd4, winning) Qxd5 7.Nxd5 0-0-0

See also
 Keres Defence (1.d4 e6 2.c4 Bb4)
 List of chess openings
 List of chess openings named after places

References

 Polugajewski, Lev (1984), Damengambit, Tschigorin System bis Tarrasch-Verteidigung, Sportverlag Berlin

Further reading

 Baltic Defense to the Queens Gambit, by Andrew Soltis, Chess Digest, .
 Keres Defence, by Giovanni Falchetta, 1992, .

Chess openings